Beedon is a village and civil parish about 6½ miles (10.4 km) north of Newbury in West Berkshire, England.

Geography
The village has outlying farmhouses, surrounded by farmland and hedgerows, and is otherwise clustered around the old A34 Oxford Road, now unclassified, which runs through the village, parallel to the modern A34, with the latter acting as a bypass. The other village street, Stanmore Road, heads north west from Oxford Road, and has the parish church and village school.

Beedon Common
Beedon Common is a hamlet and former common in Beedon.

History
Beedon is listed in the Domesday Book of 1086 as a property of Abingdon Abbey, with Walter de Rivers as the tenant. It passed by inheritance to the de Lisle and later the Roos family. After the manor reverted to the Crown, it was awarded to the Reade family in 1615. In  1857 Sir John Chandos Reade sold the manor to Lewis Loyd, whose son Samuel became Baron Overstone. The manor was then inherited by Overstone's daughter, Harriet Loyd-Lindsay, Baroness Wantage.

There was a RAF decoy airfield opened to the west of the town during World War II and its role was to deflect the bombing of real airfields.  It was parented by nearby RAF Harwell, in Oxfordshire.

Natural conservation areas
Beedon has a site of Special Scientific Interest (SSSI) just to the north-east of the village, called Ashridge Wood.

Demography

Amenities

Transport
Beedon is served by Newbury and District bus services 6 and 6A from Newbury.

Notable buildings

Manor house
Beedon manor house was built in 1553 but mostly dates from the early in the 18th century.

Parish church
The Church of England parish church of Saint Nicholas is a Grade I listed building built in about 1220.

See also
 List of civil parishes in Berkshire

References

External links

Villages in Berkshire
West Berkshire District
Civil parishes in Berkshire